Luis Rouxinol (born 8 August 1968) is a top bullfighter in Portugal and averages around 40–60 bullfights a year. He was born in Pegões, Montijo, with João Moura as his godfather. He received his alternativa, becoming a professional bullfighter, on 10 June 1987 in Santarém.

See also 
Portuguese-style bullfighting
List of bullfighters

References 
Portugal News - 2002 article about Luis Rouxinol and anti-bullfighting activists
Toureio - Portuguese site about bullfighting

1968 births
Living people
Portuguese bullfighters
People from Montijo, Portugal
Sportspeople from Setúbal District